Nothocorticium is a genus of fungi in the family Corticiaceae. The genus is monotypic, containing the single species Nothocorticium patagonicum, found in Argentina.

References

External links
 

Corticiales
Monotypic Basidiomycota genera
Fungi of South America